Barton Hill may refer to:

 Barton Hill, Bristol, England
 Barton Hill, North Yorkshire, England

See also
 Barton Hills (disambiguation)